Lu Jia may refer to:

Lu Jia
 Lu Jia (Western Han) (d. 170 BCE), Western Han official

Lü Jia
 Lü Jia (prince of Lü) (呂嘉), the second prince of Lü.
 Lü Jia (Nanyue) or Lữ Gia (died 110 BC), Prime Minister of Nanyue
 Jia Lu (呂嘉, born 1954), Chinese painter
 Lü Jia (conductor) (呂嘉, born 1964), Chinese conductor